is an asteroid and Mars trojan orbiting near the  of Mars.

Discovery, orbit and physical properties
 was discovered on 14 July 2007, by the Observatorio Astronómico de La Sagra. 
Its orbit is characterized by low eccentricity (0.054), moderate inclination (18.6°) and a semi-major axis of 1.52 AU. Upon discovery, it was classified as Mars-crosser by the Minor Planet Center. Its orbit is well determined as it is currently (March 2013) based on 87 observations with a data-arc span of 4,800 days.  has an absolute magnitude of 17.8, which gives a characteristic diameter of 870 m.

Mars trojan and orbital evolution
Jean Meeus suspected that  was a Mars Trojan, and this was confirmed by Reiner Stoss's analysis of two sets of observations dating from 1998 on the MPC database. It was confirmed to be a Mars Trojan numerically in 2012. Recent calculations confirm that it is a stable  Mars Trojan asteroid with a libration period of 1310 years and an amplitude of 14°. These values as well as its short-term orbital evolution are similar to those of 5261 Eureka. Out of all known Mars Trojans, it currently has the smallest relative (to Mars) semimajor axis, 0.000059 AU.

Origin
Long-term numerical integrations show that its orbit is very stable on Gyr time-scales (1 Gyr = 1 billion years). As in the case of Eureka, calculations in both directions of time (4.5 Gyr into the past and 4.5 Gyr into the future) indicate that  may be a primordial object, perhaps a survivor of the planetesimal population that formed in the terrestrial planets region early in the history of the Solar System.

See also 
 5261 Eureka (1990 MB)

References

Further reading

External links 
  data at MPC.
 
 

311999
311999
311999
20070714